Greenbank may refer to:

Places

Australia
Greenbank, Queensland

Canada
Greenbank, Ontario, Canada
Greenbank Airport

United Kingdom
Greenbank, Bristol, England
Greenbank, Cheshire, England; see United Kingdom locations
Greenbank, Chester, a house in England
Greenbank railway station
Greenbank, Edinburgh, Scotland
Greenbank Garden, a Category A listed house, garden, woodland and National Trust site in Clarkston, East Renfrewshire
Greenbank, Falkirk, Scotland; see United Kingdom locations
Greenbank, Falmouth, England; see Royal Cornwall Yacht Club
Greenbank Hotel, Falmouth, Cornwall
Greenbank (ward), Liverpool, England
Greenbank House
Greenbank Park
Greenbank Sports Academy, home of Mersey Tigers professional basketball team
Greenbank, Plymouth, England
Greenbank, Shetland Islands, Scotland; see United Kingdom locations

United States
Greenbank, Delaware
Greenbank, Washington
GreenBank, a bank in Greeneville, Tennessee, USA being acquired by North American Financial Holdings

Other uses
Greenbank (surname)

See also
Green Bank (disambiguation)